A point of sail is a sailing craft's direction of travel under sail in relation to the true wind direction over the surface.

The principal points of sail roughly correspond to 45° segments of a circle, starting with 0° directly into the wind. For many sailing craft 45° on either side of the wind is a no-go zone, where a sail is unable to mobilize power from the wind. Sailing on a course as close to the wind as possible—approximately 45°—is termed beating, a point of sail when the sails are close-hauled. At 90° off the wind, a craft is on a beam reach.  The point of sail between beating and a beam reach is called a close reach. At 135° off the wind, a craft is on a broad reach. At 180° off the wind (sailing in the same direction as the wind), a craft is running downwind.

A given point of sail (beating, close reach, beam reach, broad reach, and running downwind) is defined in reference to the true wind—the wind felt by a stationary observer. The motive power, and thus appropriate position of the sails, is determined by the apparent wind: the wind relative to an observer on the sailing craft. The apparent wind is the combined effect of the velocities of the true wind and of the sailing craft.

A sail with the airflow parallel to its surface, while angled into the apparent wind, acts substantially like a wing with lift as a force acting perpendicular to its surface. A sail with the apparent wind perpendicular to its surface, acts substantially like a parachute with the drag on the sail as the dominant force. As a sailing craft transitions from close-hauled to running downwind, the lifting force decreases and the drag force increases. At the same time, the resistance to sidewards motion needed to keep the craft on course also decreases, along with the sideways tipping force.

There is a zone of approximately 45° on either side of the true wind, where a sail cannot generate lift, called the "no-go zone". The angle encompassed by the no-go zone depends on the airfoil efficiency of the craft's sails and the craft's lateral resistance on the surface (from hydrofoils, outriggers, or a keel in the water, runners on ice, or wheels on land). A craft remaining in its no-go zone will slow to a stop—it will be "in irons".

The points of sail 
The recognized points of sail are in reference to the true wind direction, as indicated by a fixed wind indicator (flag, windsock, etc.), and encompass:

 Into the wind where a sailing craft is pointed directly upwind in the middle of the no-go zone, where sails cannot generate power.
 Close-hauled where a craft is sailing as close to the wind as its sails can generate lift (like a wing) to power the craft.
 Reaching, where sails generate lift to power the craft, including a:
 Close reach: between close-hauled and a beam reach.
 Beam reach: the craft has the true wind at a right angle (on its beam).
 Broad reach: the course on which the sail's ability to generate lift is transitioning to primarily propelling the craft with drag with the wind behind the sail.
 Running downwind where a craft has the wind coming from behind, perpendicular to the sail, and generating power through drag.

Into the wind 

A sailing craft cannot sail directly into the wind, nor on a course that is too close to the direction from which the wind is blowing, because the sails cannot generate lift in this "no-go zone". A craft remaining in the no-go zone will slow to a stop and be in irons.

No-go zone 
The range of directions into which a sailing craft cannot sail is called the no-go zone. The span of the no-go zone depends on the efficiency of a sailing craft's sails and its resistance to sideways motion in the water (using a keel or foils) on ice or on land, typically at an angle between 30 and 50 degrees from the wind.  A craft with sufficient momentum to reach the opposite tack, the vessel passing through the eye of the wind is in stays—unable to provide sail power until it exits the no-go zone. If a sailing craft tacks too slowly through the eye of the wind, or otherwise loses forward motion in the no-go zone, it will coast to a stop, with its sails unable to generate power and its rudder ineffective.

Going out of the no-go zone 
The following applies to a fore-and-aft rigged ship with at least one jib.

To have the ship go out of the no-go zone once it has stopped in irons, the jib should be laid aback (see below) with its sheet hauled in to have the jib push backward and to the side. The rudder will then regain action and it can be used to help the backward-going ship move away from the no-go zone. Once the mainsail is full-blown again, the ship is out of the no-go zone and the jib can be moved over to the other tack (i.e. on the same tack as the mainsail) and the rudder to "straight ahead" to complete the going-about and go forward again.

In irons 
A stopped craft in the no-go zone is said to be in irons. A square-rigged vessel in irons by accident is taken aback with the sails blown against the mast or laid aback if deliberate. In either case, the stopped vessel will be blown backwards, which with proper positioning of the rudder allows the vessel to point outside the no-go zone and resume forward motion, once the sails can draw power. Iceboats are often parked in irons with a brake applied to the ice to prevent motion. To commence sailing, the craft is steered to one side and boarded, once the sail can draw power.

Close-hauled 

A sailing craft is said to be sailing close-hauled when its sails are trimmed in tightly and are acting substantially like a wing, relying on lift to propel the craft forward on a course as close to the wind as the sail can provide lift. This point of sail lets the sailing craft travel upwind, diagonally to the wind direction.  

The smaller the angle between the direction of the true wind and the course of the sailing craft, the higher the craft is said to point. A craft that can point higher or sail faster upwind is said to be more weatherly. Pinching occurs as a craft's point of sail approaches the no-go zone and its speed falls off sharply.

Sailing to windward 

In order to sail upwind, sailing craft must zig-zag across the direction of the oncoming wind, called beating to windward. The higher a vessel that can point into the wind, the shorter its "course made good" to an upwind destination. Beating upwind, a vessel alternates between having the wind come on the port and starboard sides (the port and starboard tack). Changing from one tack to the other, by steering through the wind direction, is called tacking, or going about.

Reaching 
A craft sailing with the true wind on its side (within limits) is reaching. Wind is flowing over the surface of the sail, creating lift (like a wing) to propel the craft. Because lift is more powerful than drag on this point of sail, sailing craft achieve their highest speeds on a reach. A variety of high-performance sailing craft sail fastest on a broad reach with the sails close-hauled at speeds several times the true windspeed. Depending on the angle of the true wind with respect to the course sailed, a reach may be close, beam, or broad, as follows:

 A close reach is a course closer to the true wind (more upwindwards) than a beam reach, but below close-hauled; i.e., any angle between a beam reach and close-hauled. The sails are trimmed in (hauled towards the centreline of the hull), but not as tightly as for a close-hauled course.

 A beam reach is when the true wind is at a right angle to the direction of motion (so called because the wind is parallel to the cross-hull beams, if any; see beam).

 A broad reach is when the wind is coming from behind the sailing craft at an angle. This represents a range of wind angles, between a beam reach (see next paragraph) and running downwind. On a sailboat (but not an iceboat) the sails are eased out away from the sailing craft, but not as much as on a downwind run. If the sailcraft points any further downwind, the sails cease acting substantially like a wing.

Running downwind 

Sailing with the wind or running before the wind, the sails generate power primarily through drag (like a parachute) with the true wind directly from behind the sailing craft. A sailing craft propelled dead downwind cannot attain a speed faster than the true wind. 

However, higher-performance sailing craft achieve a higher velocity made good downwind, by sailing on whatever broad reach is most efficient on that particular craft, and jibing as needed. The longer course is offset by the faster speed. For instance, if a vessel sails alternately in the directions 45° from the downwind direction, it will sail  (≈1.41) times farther than it would if it sailed dead downwind — but as long as it can sail faster than 1.4 times the true wind velocity, the indirect route will let it travel faster.

Craft running downwind increase power from the sails by increasing total area presented to the following wind, sometimes by putting out specialized sails for the purpose, such as a spinnaker on a fore-and-aft rigged vessel. Another technique is to place the jib to windward (opposite to the main sail), called  "wing on wing" or one of several other terms. In light winds, certain square-rigged vessels may set studding sails, sails that extend outwards from the yardarms, to create a larger sail area.

True wind versus apparent wind

True wind (VT) combines with the sailing craft's velocity (VB) to be the apparent wind velocity (VA); the air velocity experienced by instrumentation or crew on a moving sailing craft. Apparent wind velocity provides the motive power for the sails on any given point of sail. The apparent wind is equal to the true wind velocity for a stopped craft; it may be faster than the true wind speed on some points of sail, or it may be slower e.g. when a sailing craft sails dead downwind.

The speed of sailboats through the water is limited by the resistance that results from hull drag in the water. Ice boats typically have the least resistance to forward motion of any sailing craft; consequently, a sailboat experiences a wider range of apparent wind angles than does an ice boat, whose speed is typically great enough to have the apparent wind coming from a few degrees to one side of its course, necessitating sailing with the sail sheeted in for most points of sail. On conventional sail boats, the sails are set to create lift for those points of sail where it's possible to align the leading edge of the sail with the apparent wind.

For a sailboat, point of sail significantly affects the lateral force to which the boat is subjected. The higher the boat points into the wind, the stronger the lateral force, which results in both increased leeway and heeling.  Leeway, the effect of the boat moving sideways through the water, can be counteracted by a keel or other underwater foils, including daggerboard, centerboard, skeg and rudder. Lateral force also induces heeling in a sailboat, which is resisted by the shape and configuration of the hull (or hulls, in the case of catamarans) and the weight of ballast, and can be further resisted by the weight of the crew. As the boat points off the wind, lateral force and the forces required to resist it become reduced.
On ice boats and sand yachts, lateral forces are countered by the lateral resistance of the blades on ice or of the wheels on sand, and of their distance apart, which generally prevents heeling.

See also
 Glossary of nautical terms (A-L)
 Glossary of nautical terms (M-Z)
 Sailing
 Tacking (sailing), turning so that the bow briefly points dead upwind
 Gybing, turning so that the bow briefly points dead downwind

References

Bibliography
 Rousmaniere, John, The Annapolis Book of Seamanship, Simon & Schuster, 1999
 Chapman Book of Piloting (various contributors), Hearst Corporation, 1999
 Herreshoff, Halsey (consulting editor), The Sailor’s Handbook, Little Brown and Company, 1983
 Seidman, David, The Complete Sailor, International Marine, 1995
 Jobson, Gary, Sailing Fundamentals, Simon & Schuster, 1987

Sailing